H. J. Grell was a member of the Wisconsin State Assembly. He was elected to the Assembly in 1914 and 1916. Other positions Grell held include President (similar to Mayor) and a member of the school board of Johnson Creek, Wisconsin. He was a Republican. Grell was born in Johnson Creek on November 29, 1866.

References

People from Johnson Creek, Wisconsin
Mayors of places in Wisconsin
School board members in Wisconsin
1866 births
Year of death missing
Republican Party members of the Wisconsin State Assembly